The  National Library of Korea is located in Seoul, South Korea and was established in 1945. It houses over 10 million volumes, including over 1,134,000 foreign books and some of the National Treasures of South Korea.

It was relocated within Seoul, from Sogong-dong, Jung-gu to Namsan-dong in 1974, and again to the present location at Banpo-dong, Seocho-gu, in 1988. It was transferred from the Ministry of Education to the Ministry of Culture in 1991.

National Library of Korea History 
Libraries in Korea came into being due to the major influence Western ideologies had on Korea as well as Japanese Colonialism. Both of these influences began the modernization of Korea. The first denomination of the library was officially established in 1906 by Lee Keun-sang, Lee Beom-gu and Yoon Chi-ho. It was named the Daehan Library. The Daehan Library, however, was never made public and 100,000 books were confiscated by the Joseon Government in 1911.

Other libraries were established the Daedong Seogwan was the first privately run public library. It provided all of its materials for free to the public, and also printed books in house. Unfortunately, Japanese Colonialism closed down Korea and stopped all print making throughout Korea: newspapers, magazines, books, etc. Only approved media and propaganda continued to be printed. 

In 1919, Yun Ik-seon was imprisoned for handing out newspapers to students. After his release in 1920 he formed the Gyeongseong Library; a library specifically for Koreans. He and his colleagues donated most of their money into this project in an attempt to bring about a type of modern enlightenment. They collected books and even created a reading room for women and girls, which was unusual ("modern") for that time. In 1921, Lee Beom-seung a law student, created another Gyeongseong Library in an attempt to help his nation. Yun Ik-seon handed over the running of the Gyeonseong Library to Lee Beom-seung who in turn created a separate library for children with no education. He created an elementary school education program using this library. However, it faced dire financial hardship and was only salvaged after Korea's independence when Lee Beom-seung became the first mayor of Seoul. 

Korean National Library was founded in 1945, three years before the Korean Government was officially formed. In August, 1945, Korea became independent from 35 years of Japanese colonialism, and in October of that same year Park Bong-seok created the National Library taking over all the libraries within the area collecting their printing materials, books, and other valuable materials. He helped form the basis for Korea's library system.

In 1946 he created a national library school to train future librarians. After that he continued combining the surrounding libraries together to share not only resources but a mission, to salvage the cultural history that Japanese colonialism had attempted to expunge. 

In 1948, a nationwide movement was formed called "One Country, One Library." Their goal was to salvage the libraries, books, and materials across Korea - saving them from being burned and destroyed. They also sought to establish as many new libraries as they could. They also began a literacy program to reteach Korean to their population. According to statistics only 20% of Koreans could still read Korean. 

They joined the IFLA in 1955. In this year they also provided classes as well as readings for the public. In the following years they worked on updating their activities and membership along with connecting with even more libraries. They created awards, fundraisers, and established systems to help South Korea as a whole. In 1988 they moved to Seocho-gu, Seoul.

The Mission and Responsibilities of the National Library of Korea 
The National Library of Korea's main purpose is to "contribute to the development of the nationals knowledge through comprehensive collection of domestic and foreign knowledge, safe preservation, and prompt provision' in order to preserve the intellectual and cultural heritage of Korea and raise the level of knowledge/information for Koreans." The National Library of Korea guarantees that the national knowledge collected by them is preserved by them and shared with the world.

Purpose of the Collection Development Guidelines:

The purpose of the National Library Collection Development Guideline is to provide standards and priorities for the collection development and conservation management of the National Library" Their goal is to establish a  foundation for future collection development. 

Basic direction of collection development:

The National Library of Korea shall collect as many national documents to be registered and preserved for the people of Korea and the World to "ensure the use of the present and future generations." The National Library of Korea prioritizes information related to the cultural heritage of Korea above all else. You can also read a detailed guideline on their collection development policies in the link below.

Mission Statement for the National Library of Korea 
The National Library of Korea transmits the knowledge and Cultural heritage of the Republic of Korea, enriches the intellectual life of the people, and contributes to the cultural development of the country and Society."

The National Library of Korea's Vision is to be a Library that enriches the lives of people.

Their Four Goals:

1. Advancement of the foundation for access and conservation of national knowledge resources Strengthening the collection of national knowledge resources Expanding the role of the National Bibliographic Data Center Reinforcement of integrated management of old Korean literature Strengthening the capacity to preserve national knowledge resource.

2. Reinforcement of user-centered national library service. Research and Policy Support Library Services. Knowledge information service for various levels. Library promotion and marketing.

3. Maximizing library cooperation and leadership. Hub of professional education for human resources in the library. Improving national status through international exchanges and cooperation. Creating and revitalizing the foundation for inter-Korean library cooperation

4. Intelligent library digital service. Expansion of national digital collection Smart digital service implementation. Sharing digital services and strengthening cooperation.

Digital Collection 
The National Library of Korea possesses an extensive digital collection containing an archive for the Korean Newspaper, Gazette, Records relating to Korea's history with foreign relations and records relating to the history, research, and art that has been created in South Korea. Many of these resources are acceptable to anyone who accesses their website. They also possess digital repositories for their patrons/members.

Public transport connection

The library is served by Seoul Subway Lines 3, 7 and 9 which all connect at Express Bus terminal Station.

Collection Statistics
As in November 2020;

See also 
National Digital Library of Korea
National Library for Children and Young Adults
Information Center on North Korea
National Assembly Library of Korea
List of national and state libraries

References

External links 

  

Buildings and structures in Seocho District
South Korea
Libraries in Seoul
1945 establishments in Korea
Libraries established in 1945
World Digital Library partners